Ibn Ezra was the name of a prominent Jewish family from Spain spanning many centuries.

The name ibn Ezra may refer to:
 Abraham ibn Ezra (1089–1167), Spanish rabbi, man of letters and writer
 Joseph ibn Ezra (16th–17th centuries), oriental rabbi and Talmudist
 Judah ben Joseph ibn Ezra (12th century), Spanish chamberlain of the king's court
 Moses ibn Ezra (11th-century–12th-century), Spanish rabbi, philosopher, linguist, and poet

See also
"Rabbi ben Ezra", a poem by Robert Browning about Abraham ibn Ezra (1092–1167) above
Ben Ezra (disambiguation)